Zirenkel is an Afro-Asiatic language spoken in Chad.

Notes

References 

Johnson, Eric. 2005. Étude sociolinguistique de la langue Zirenkel du Tchad. SIL Electronic Survey Reports 2005–023. Dallas: SIL International. Online. URL: https://sil.org/silesr/abstract.asp?ref=2005-023.

East Chadic languages
Languages of Chad